Arthur Lea may refer to:

 Arthur Lea (footballer) (1866–1945), Welsh footballer
 Arthur Lea (bishop) (1868–1958), Canadian Anglican bishop
 Arthur Mills Lea (1868–1932), Australian entomologist